Fishing industry in the United Kingdom may refer to:
Fishing industry in England
Fishing industry in Scotland
Fishing industry in Wales

Fishing industry
Economy of the United Kingdom